The Merck Index is an encyclopedia of chemicals, drugs and biologicals with over 10,000 monograph on single substances or groups of related compounds published online by the Royal Society of Chemistry.

History
The first edition of the Merck's Index was published in 1889 by the German chemical company Emanuel Merck and was primarily used as a sales catalog for Merck's growing list of chemicals it sold. The American subsidiary was established two years later and continued to publish it. During World War I the US government seized Merck's US operations and made it a separate American "Merck" company that continued to publish the Merck Index.

In 2012 the Merck Index was licensed to the Royal Society of Chemistry. An online version of The Merck Index, including historic records and new updates not in the print edition, is commonly available through research libraries. It also includes an appendix with monographs on organic named reactions.

The 15th edition was published in April 2013.

Monographs in The Merck Index typically contain:
 a CAS registry number
 synonyms of the substance, such as trivial names and International Union of Pure and Applied Chemistry nomenclature
 a chemical formula
 molecular weight
 percent composition
 a structural formula
 a description of the substance's appearance
 melting point and boiling point
 solubility in solvents commonly used in the laboratory
 citations to other literature regarding the compound's chemical synthesis
 a therapeutic category, if applicable
 caution and hazard information

Editions
1st (1889) – first edition released by E. Merck (Germany)
2nd (1896) – second edition released by Merck's American subsidiary and added medicines from the United States Pharmacopeia and National Formulary
3rd (1907)
4th (1930)
5th (1940)
6th (1952)
7th (1960) – first named editor is Merck chemist Paul G. Stecher
8th (1968) – editor Paul G. Stecher
9th (1976) – editor Martha Windholz, a Merck chemist
10th (1983),  – editor Martha Windholz. In 1984 the Index became available online as well as printed.
11th (1989), 
12th (1996),  – editor Susan Budavari, a Merck chemist
13th (2001),  – editor Maryadele O'Neil, senior editor at Merck
14th (2006),  – editor Maryadele O'Neil
15th (2013),  – editor Maryadele O'Neil; first edition under the Royal Society of Chemistry

See also 
 List of academic databases and search engines
 The Merck Manual of Diagnosis and Therapy
 The Merck Veterinary Manual
 Home Health and Pet Health

References

External links
 

Merck Group
1889 non-fiction books
1896 non-fiction books
1907 non-fiction books
1930 non-fiction books
1940 non-fiction books
1952 non-fiction books
1960 non-fiction books
1968 non-fiction books
1976 non-fiction books
1983 non-fiction books
1989 non-fiction books
1996 non-fiction books
2001 non-fiction books
2006 non-fiction books
Encyclopedias of science
1889 in science
Royal Society of Chemistry
Chemical databases
Biological databases